Khawabi, also spelled Qala'at al-Khawabi is a village and medieval citadel in northwestern Syria, administratively part of the Tartus Governorate, located 20 kilometers northeast of Tartus and 12 kilometers east of al-Sawda. Khawabi is situated in a hilly area, surrounded by olive groves, in the Coastal Mountain Range. Nearby localities include al-Sawda and to the west, Al-Annazah to the northwest, al-Qamsiyah to the north, Brummanet Raad to the northeast, al-Shaykh Badr to the east, Khirbet al-Faras to the south and Bimalkah to the southwest.

According to the Syria Central Bureau of Statistics, Khawabi had a population of 1,039 in the 2004 census. Its inhabitants are predominantly Sunni Muslims. The village formerly had a significant Ismaili population until the early 20th century, and during the medieval period, its citadel (Qala'at Khawabi) served as a center of the Ismaili community when they were known as the Assassins. The citadel itself has been inhabited since at least the 12th century.

History

Medieval era
Like many of the other castles in coastal Syria, the castle of Khawabi has its origins in the Phoenician era (1200–539 BC). In 985 the Arab geographer al-Muqaddasi noted that Hisn al-Khawabi ("Citadel of Khawabi") was part of Jund Hims ("Military District of Homs") during the Abbasid era. In 1025 the citadel was restored by the Byzantines. Khawabi later came into the possession of one Muhammad ibn Ali ibn Hamid.

The Crusaders, who referred to the citadel as La Coible, acquired Khawabi from Ibn Hamid in 1111 and assigned its governorship to a local lord. However, author and expert in Ismaili studies, Peter Willey, writes that there is no evidence the Crusaders ever held it though they did refer to it as Coible and considered it an endangerment to their coastal mountain positions. A short time following the Nizari Ismailis' capture of Masyaf in 1141, they proceeded to conquer Khawabi. By the time the Ismailis' chief Rashid al-Din Sinan renovated the citadel into a formidable possession in 1160, Khawabi had developed into an Ismaili center. Part of Sinan's renovations included the construction of a tower at the citadel's entrance and the replacement of some walls. Khawabi became geo-strategically important for the Ismailis since it provided further defense for other Ismaili mountain fortresses to its southwest.

After the Ismailis assassinated Raymond, the eldest son of Bohemond IV, prince of Antioch at the Cathedral of Our Lady of Tortosa in Tartus, Bohemond and a reinforcement of Templars assaulted Khawabi in 1214. The Ismailis requested aid from the Ayyubid ruler of Aleppo, az-Zahir Ghazi, who in turn appealed to his rival and uncle al-Adil, the Ayyubid sultan of Egypt. Az-Zahir's relief army was dealt a major setback when the Muslim force was nearly destroyed in a Crusader ambush at Jabal Bahra, on the approaches of Khawabi. However, after al-Adil's son, al-Mu'azzam of Damascus, launched several raids against Bohemond's district of Tripoli, destroying all of its villages, Bohemond was compelled to withdraw from Khawabi and issue an apology to az-Zahir.

The Ismailis maintained their control over Khawabi until the beginning of the Mamluk era in Syria. In 1273 the Mamluk sultan Baibars annexed and destroyed the citadel. From that point on, although the Ismailis had continued to live in the area with limited autonomy under Mamluk rule, the dismantled fortress was no longer used for military purposes. The remainder of the castle's infrastructure was adapted for agricultural or domestic purposes. In 1484 the Mamluk sultan Qaitbay ended the tax on loom products, cattle slaughtering and shoe repairing for Khawabi and nearby al-Kahf.

Ottoman era
During the Ottoman era (1516–1918), the Khawabi citadel became a center of the Nahiyah Havabi ("Sub-District of Khawabi.") It was originally part of the Sanjak of Tripoli, part of the larger Tripoli Eyalet. In 1563 Khawabi was separated to form the Sanjak of Jableh, along with several other subdistricts in the coastal mountain range. The Sha'ir family from Tripoli served as the governors of Khawabi in the 18th century after being driven out of Batroun.

In 1831 the citadel and its nahiyah became one of the 13 subdistricts of the Sanjak of Latakia, then under the authority of the governors of Acre. In 1865 Khawabi was reassigned to the Sanjak of Marqab, part of the larger province of Tripoli. The Ottomans constructed a mosque in 1892–93 named after Sultan Abdul Hamid II. The administrative region of Khawabi contained a mixture of religious sects according to the Ottoman census of 1878, with Alawites constituting 47% of the population which was 1,837, Ismaili Muslims made up 19% of the population, Greek Orthodox Christians 15%, Sunni Muslims 14% and Maronite Christians 5%.

Modern era
In 1918–19, during the initial period of French Mandate rule that soon followed the Ottoman defeat in Syria, the center of the nahiyah was transferred to al-Sawda by the French authorities as a consequence of Khawabi's participation in the anti-French Syrian Coastal Revolt led by Sheikh Salih al-Ali, an Alawite sheikh from the area. Sheikh al-Ali had used the citadel to store weaponry during the revolt. Most of its Ismaili inhabitants had been evacuated to nearby villages while a smaller number had emigrated the Ismaili-majority towns of Masyaf and Salamiyah in the vicinity of Hama. The French authorities set fire to the citadel to punish the fortress village for its use against the French occupation.

During the French Mandate, Khawabi became overshadowed by al-Sawda, with people traveling to the latter town for commercial transactions instead of Khawabi as in Ottoman times. While Khawabi rapidly declined, al-Sawda became a dynamic regional center having a clinic, a secondary school and a wide range of shops. The Ismaili population in the village had been gradually declining and by 1930 none of the original inhabitants remained. Today Khawabi's inhabitants are mostly Sunni Muslim. Most of the Ismaili residents fled the village following disputes with the Sunni Muslim residents over land and livestock. The dispute ultimately prompted the Sunnis to invite Alawite militias, who were also in conflict with the Ismailis during that time, to assault the community. About 100 residents were killed and thousands more in the area fled to Tartus. Most of Khawabi's former Ismaili inhabitants relocated to the nearby hamlet of Aqir Zayti. There are two other Ismaili hamlets in Khawabi's vicinity: Awaru (to the west) and Brummanet Raad to the northeast.

Between 1970 and 1998 much of the strongly-built area of the fortress's northern end was dismantled. The current inhabitants, who split into eight main families, own their homes in the village and are largely self-sufficient. Though they are connected to electricity, there were no telephone lines in 1998. A house adjacent to the central citadel serves as the residence of Khawabi's community headman. The citadel is currently registered as private property by the Syrian Directorate of Antiquities and Museums.

Fortress architecture
Qala'at Khawabi measures 350 meters by 200 meters, having a total area of roughly 70,000 square meters. It has a single entrance which is preceded by two flights of shallow stairways acquainted for cavalry. The first flight consists of 20 steps, leading to the second flight which has 40 steps into the still-preserved gatehouse at the northern end of the fortress. The gatehouse has a double entrance protected by archways and its upper floor's windows have been enlarged.

The fortress consists of two principal sections, Harat Rashid al-Din Sinan (referred to as Bayt al-Agha by locals) and Harat al-Saki. The former occupies the upper area of the citadel and many of its historic characteristics, with the exception of its cellars and stables, virtually disappeared with the construction of new housing in the 1990s. The visible parts of the wall in this section consist of thin reinforced concrete, typical of the architectural designs of the late Ottoman era. Harat al-Saki retains much of its historical character, with its ruined residences, medieval walls and cellars. Although a number of residents of the citadel have built new homes by dismantling some parts of the walls, most of Harat al-Saki's residents have built relocated outside of the citadel walls.

The eastern part of Qala'at Khawabi contains the fortress's main defenses, although its northern end is also strongly buttressed. The latter part of the fortress possesses chambers meant for water storage. In the center of the fortress stands the citadel which is protected by double-walls. A narrow north–south path, from which two alleyways to the eastern and western sections branch out, runs through the middle of the fortress. Willey considered the remaining stone masonry of the outside walls to be "fine," disagreeing with Syrian architecture expert Ross Burns' generally unfavorable opinion of Khawabi's stonework.

References

Bibliography

Burns, Ross (2009) The Monuments of Syria: A Guide (third edition) I.B. Tauris, London, page 140, 

Archaeological sites in Tartus Governorate
Castles in Syria
Populated places in Tartus District
Castles of the Nizari Ismaili state